Eisenberg Paris is a French skincare, make-up and fragrance brand for women and men that was founded by José Eisenberg in 2000.

History 
In 2000, José Eisenberg launched his brand, which he called José Eisenberg. He shortened the brand's name to Eisenberg the following year. José Eisenberg is involved in every creation and the day-to-day operations of the brand along with his son, Edmond.

Collaborations 

Brazilian artist Juarez Machado was commissioned to illustrate in paintings each fragrance of L'Art du Parfum collection. His artworks adorning the collection’s packaging.

References 

Cosmetics companies of France
Perfume houses
Cosmetics brands
Luxury brands
History of cosmetics
French brands